Nagwa Ibrahim Saleh Ali (born 10 June 1975) is an Egyptian former racewalker. She is the Egyptian record holder in the 20 kilometres walk with her time of 1:41:08 hours from 2002. She is a three-time African champion and represented Egypt at the IAAF World Race Walking Cup on four occasions.

Ali was among the foremost female walkers in Africa and among Arab countries during her career. She won three gold medals at the African Championships in Athletics, winning in 1998, 2002 and 2006. She was also runner-up in 1996 and 2000, finishing behind Algeria's Dounia Kara then Bahia Boussad. At the All-Africa Games she was twice a silver medallist, taking second place in the 5000 metres walk behind Kara  in 1995, then finishing behind South Africa's Susan Vermeulen in the 10 kilometres walk in 1999.

In Arab regional competition, she was a gold medallist at the 1998 Arab Athletics Championships and at the 1999 Pan Arab Games. As at African-level, she was runner-up twice to Kara at the Arab Championships (1993 and 1995). The last medals of her international career came in 2007, when she placed second behind Tunisia's Chaima Trabelsi at both the 2007 Arab Athletics Championships and the Pan Arab Games.

As a junior, she represented Egypt at the 1994 World Junior Championships in Athletics. She was the champion at the 1994 Arab Junior Athletics Championships and runner-up at the 1994 African Junior Athletics Championships.

International competitions

National titles
Egyptian Athletics Championships
5000 m track walk: 1997, 1998, 1999, 2000, 2002
10 km road walk: 1993, 1996, 1997
10,000 metres: 1998, 1999

See also
List of champions of the African Championships in Athletics

References

External links

Living people
1975 births
Egyptian racewalkers
Female racewalkers
Egyptian female athletes
African Games silver medalists for Egypt
African Games medalists in athletics (track and field)
Athletes (track and field) at the 1995 All-Africa Games
Athletes (track and field) at the 1999 All-Africa Games
Athletes (track and field) at the 2001 Mediterranean Games
Mediterranean Games competitors for Egypt